Statistics of Emperor's Cup in the 2001 season.

Overview
It was contested by 80 teams, and Shimizu S-Pulse won the championship.

Results

First round
Ohara Gakuen JaSRA 1–3 Komazawa University
Juntendo University 3–4 Sagawa Express
Sun Life FC 0–4 Kunimi High School
Saga Nanyo FC 1–0 Kibi International University
Tokai University 2–0 Omiya Ardija
Okinawa Kariyushi FC 1–2 Oita Trinita
Nagasaki University 1–3 Nippon Steel Corporation Oita FC
Tottori 1–0 Apple Sports College
Saitama 0–14 Yokohama
Muchz FC 0–7 Shonan Bellmare
NTT Kumamoto 3–1 Yamagata FC
Sony Sendai 0–1 Nara Sangyo University
Kwansei Gakuin University 0–5 Kawasaki Frontale
Fukuoka University 1–1(PK 1–3) Sagan Tosu
Hosei University 1–0 Honda Lock
Iwami FC 0–4 Jatco
Gifu Technical High School 1–7 Mito HollyHock
Osaka University of Health and Sport Sciences 0–4 Ventforet Kofu
Denso 4–2 Akita Commercial High School
ALO's Hokuriku 2–1 Doto University
Mind House Yokkaichi 1–3 Albirex Niigata
Volca Kagoshima 2–3 Montedio Yamagata
Tochigi SC 3–1 Fukui University of Technology
Ehime FC 3–2 Fukuyama University
FC Primeiro 0–4 Vegalta Sendai
Nirasaki Astros 0–4 Kyoto Purple Sanga
FC KYOKEN Kyoto 4–0 Morioka Zebra
Gunma Fortuna 6–1 Aster Aomori
Kochi University 0–1 Honda FC
Ryutsu Keizai University 3–1 Hannan University
Kainan FC 1–1(PK 4–2) Teihens FC
Yamaguchi Teachers 0–8 Otsuka Pharmaceuticals

Second round
Komazawa University 4–1 Kunimi High School
Sagawa Express 10–0 Saga Nanyo FC
Tokai University 4–3 Nippon Steel Corporation Oita FC
Oita Trinita 2–1 Gainare Tottori
Yokohama FC 5–0 NTT Kumamoto
Shonan Bellmare 0–0(PK 3–4) Nara Sangyo University
Kawasaki Frontale 1–0 Hosei University
Sagan Tosu 1–0 Jatco SC
Mito HollyHock 1–0 Denso
Ventforet Kofu 1–0 ALO's Hokuriku
Albirex Niigata 2–1 Tochigi SC
Montedio Yamagata 1–0 Ehime FC
Vegalta Sendai 4–1 FC KYOKEN Kyoto
Kyoto Purple Sanga 3–0 Gunma Fortuna
Honda FC 6–0 Kainan FC
Ryutsu Keizai University 2–3 Otsuka Pharmaceuticals

Third round
Júbilo Iwata 3–2 Komazawa University
Nagoya Grampus Eight 0–4 Sagawa Express
Tokyo Verdy 2–0 Tokai University
Cerezo Osaka 3–2 Oita Trinita
Tokyo 0–1 Yokohama
Kashima Antlers 6–0 Nara Sangyo University
Consadole Sapporo 2–3 Kawasaki Frontale
Kashiwa Reysol 1–2 Sagan Tosu
Gamba Osaka 5–0 Mito HollyHock
Urawa Red Diamonds 2–0 Ventforet Kofu
Avispa Fukuoka 2–3 Albirex Niigata
Vissel Kobe 1–0 Montedio Yamagata
Sanfrecce Hiroshima 1–0 Vegalta Sendai
Yokohama F. Marinos 0–1 Kyoto Purple Sanga
Shimizu S-Pulse 2–1 Honda
JEF United Ichihara 5–0 Otsuka Pharmaceuticals

Fourth round
Júbilo Iwata 1–3 Tokyo Verdy
Sagawa Express 0–2 Cerezo Osaka
Yokohama 1–3 Kawasaki Frontale
Kashima Antlers 6–0 Sagan Tosu
Gamba Osaka 1–0 Albirex Niigata
Urawa Red Diamonds 4–1 Vissel Kobe
Sanfrecce Hiroshima 0–4 Shimizu S-Pulse
Kyoto Purple Sanga 0–4 JEF United Ichihara

Quarter finals
Tokyo Verdy 0–3 Kawasaki Frontale
Cerezo Osaka 4–2 Kashima Antlers
Gamba Osaka 0–2 Shimizu S-Pulse
Urawa Red Diamonds 2–1 JEF United Ichihara

Semi finals
Kawasaki Frontale 1–2 Shimizu S-Pulse
Urawa Red Diamonds 0–1 Cerezo Osaka

Final

Shimizu S-Pulse 3–2 Cerezo Osaka
Shimizu S-Pulse won the championship.

References
 NHK

Emperor's Cup
Emperor's Cup
2002 in Japanese football